Watch the World is the third and final studio album by Australian rock and pop band Little Heroes. The album was released in September 1983 and peaked at number 50.

Reception
A Perth newspaper in 1984 said "Watch the World set the standards for Australian albums last year through its fine production and engineering.
The band suddenly found itself being watched by the world as the heroes became more than your average Oz pub band."

Robert Vella said "Watch the World is an album of greater substance and less obvious commercial intent. It's not that the accessibility is missing, it's just that it is more strategically placed."

Track listing

Charts

References

Little Heroes (band) albums
EMI Records albums
1983 albums